Pollos is a municipality located in the province of Valladolid, Castile and León, Spain. According to the 2004 census (INE), the municipality has a population of 780 inhabitants.

Pollo is also the Spanish word for chicken.

See also
Cuisine of the province of Valladolid

References

Municipalities in the Province of Valladolid